The history of FC Steaua București covers the time between the foundation of  Steaua București, a Romanian football club based in Bucharest, up to the present day.

Steaua was founded on 7 June 1947 by the Romanian Royal Army, and have always been seen as the club of the Romanian Army, even though it became private in 1998. It is the most successful Romanian club, being the only one from Romania and from any communist country to have won the European Cup, which it did in 1986.

History

Early Years (1947–1949)

On 7 June 1947, at the initiative of several officers of the Romanian Royal House, the first Romanian sports club of the Army was born through a decree signed by General Mihail Lascăr, High Commander of the Romanian Royal Army. The club was to be called ASA București (Asociația Sportivă a Armatei București – English: Army Sports Association), with seven different sections (football, fencing, volleyball, boxing, shooting, athletics, tennis), and its leadership was entrusted to General-Major Oreste Alexandrescu. The decision had been adopted on the ground that several officers were already playing for different teams, which was premise to a good nucleus for forming a future competitive team. With this squad, Coloman Braun-Bogdan, the first coach in the club's history, went to a sustained training camp in the mountain resort of Sinaia. Although shirts, boots and balls were missing, atmosphere inside the team was rather optimistic. Thanks to sustained efforts, in the shortest time possible, the club soon acquired the first training suits, navy green, duck material of, and the first shirts, blue. The big surprise, however, were the 40 pairs of boots the club had purchased for the 20 selected players.

With a squad gathered in record time, ASA was preparing itself for the Romanian second league promotion play-offs. However, the new Communist government that had come to power in 1945 and assumed total control of the country at the end of 1947 stated that every sports association in the country was now to be linked to a certain trade union, be it a State Department, a Ministry or a company. However, this was not the case for first league club, Carmen București, owned by wealthy industrialist Dumitru Mociorniță, who saw his team excluded from the championship and later on dissolved, its place in the 1st league being now taken by newly formed ASA.

The team's first official competition was the 1947–48 Romanian Football Championship season, in which they finished 14th. Their first official match was played in Bucharest against Dermata Cluj and ended 0–0. The team managed to avoid relegation after a play-out with seven other teams.

On 5 June 1948, by Order 289 of the Ministry of National Defence, ASA became CSCA (Clubul Sportiv Central al Armatei – English: Central Sports Club of the Army), after which performances began to roll.

In 1949, CSCA won its first trophy in history, the Romanian Cup, after defeating CSU Cluj 2–1 in the final. Because of the championship's switch to a Soviet-inspired spring-fall system, which lasted from 1950 to 1956, CSCA played that fall in an unofficial competition called "The Autumn Cup", held in six different groups, without a final tournament, winning one of them.

CCA Golden Team (1950–1961)

In March 1950, CSCA changed its name to CCA (Casa Centrală a Armatei, English: "Central House of the Army").

Under the new name, the club would enter the high-life of Romanian football by winning their first Championship-Cup Double in 1951, just shortly after conquering their second national cup one year earlier after trailing 3–1 past Flamura Roșie Arad. The first title was achieved on goal average (which was then used as a second criterion instead of goal difference), while the cup by disposing 3–1 of Flacăra Mediaș in the final. Two subsequent titles followed consecutively after that year and another one in 1956. The team also won the Romanian Cup in 1952 (2–0 v Flacăra Ploiești) and 1955 (6–3 v Progresul Oradea).

The 1950s were years of great domestic performances, ones in which the famous "CCA Golden Team" crystallized itself, a team which sometimes confused itself with the Romania national team itself, with players such as goalkeeper Ion Voinescu, defenders Vasile Zavoda and Alexandru Apolzan, midfielders Ștefan Onisie and Tiberiu Bone or strikers Gheorghe Cacoveanu, Gheorghe Constantin, Ion Alecsandrescu, Francisc Zavoda, Iosif Petschovsky and Nicolae Tătaru directed by Technical Consultant Virgil Economu and coaches Ilie Savu and Ștefan Dobay. 1956 was one of CCA's most prestigious years, when, apart from winning the title, the team enterprised a tournament in England, where they defeated Luton Town 4–3 (which they had already defeated 5–1 in a friendly in Bucharest one year earlier), drew against Arsenal 1–1 and Sheffield Wednesday 3–3 and lost 5–0 in front of Wolverhampton Wanderers. Also, on 22 April 1956, the Romania national team beat Yugoslavia 1–0 in Belgrade with a team comprised only by CCA players.

1957 was the year Romania switched back to the fall-spring system and in whose spring CCA took part in the Danube Cup (former Mitropa Cup), being knocked out by MTK Budapest in the first round. That year, the team also made their first European Cup appearance, being eliminated by Borussia Dortmund in the European Champions Cup after a third match play-off in Bologna.

A New Star (1961–1985)

In 1961, after having won the previous two national titles, CCA changed names once again (for the final time) to CSA Steaua București (Clubul Sportiv al Armatei Steaua – English: Army Sports Club Steaua). The name Steaua is Romanian for The Star and was adopted because of the presence, just like in any other Eastern-European Army team, of a red star (turned yellow now, to symbolize Romania's tri-colour red, yellow and blue flag) on their badge.

In the late 1960s, Ștefan Covaci was hired as manager of the club. During his first season in charge, he won the Romanian League in 1967–68 and three national cups in 1969, 1970 and 1971, before leaving to coach Johan Cruyff's Ajax in 1971.

In 1972, Steaua reached the quarter-finals of the European Cup Winners' Cup, defeating Barcelona, but lost against Franz Beckenbauer's Bayern Munich 1–1 on away goals.

On 9 April 1974, Steaua's home, Stadionul Ghencea, was inaugurated with a friendly match opposing OFK Beograd which ended 2–2. The arena was something new for post-War Romania, as it was built especially for football, with a capacity of 30,000 and with no athletics track. Up to that date, Steaua had played its home matches on either two of Bucharest's largest stadiums, Republicii and 23 August.

Internally, fierce rivalry with teams like Dinamo București, Petrolul Ploiești and UTA Arad made it more and more difficult for the military team to reach the title, the 1970s and 1980s seeing them win the title only three times under their new name (1967–68, 1975–76, 1977–78). However, during that same period, Steaua won eight National Cups (1961–62, 1965–66, 1966–67, 1968–69, 1969–70, 1970–71, 1975–76 and 1978–79), ultimately being nicknamed the cup specialists.

The first half of the 1980s was a very poor period for the club, as no trophies were won for six years. However, several prodigies were transferred, such as Helmuth Duckadam, Ștefan Iovan, Miodrag Belodedici, Marius Lăcătuș, Victor Pițurcă, Mihail Majearu, Gavril Balint and Adrian Bumbescu, who would set the basis for the future team. However, these years of search and frustration did no less than to foretell the amazing performances of the 1980s and 1990s.

Champions of Europe (1985–1989)

Under the leadership of coaches Emerich Jenei and Anghel Iordănescu, Steaua had an impressive Championship run in the 1984–85 season, which they eventually won after a six-year break. What followed was an absolutely astonishing European Cup season. After eliminating Vejle, Honvéd, Kuusysi Lahti and Anderlecht, they were the first ever Romanian team to make it to a European Cup final. At the final, played on 7 May 1986 at the Ramón Sánchez Pizjuán Stadium in Seville, Spanish champions Barcelona were clear favourites, but after a goalless draw, legendary goalkeeper Helmuth Duckadam saved all four penalties taken by the Spaniards being the first ever Romanian to reach the Guinness Book for that matter, while Gavril Balint and Marius Lăcătuș converted theirs to make Steaua the first Eastern-European team to conquer the supreme continental trophy.

Gheorghe Hagi, Romanian all-time best footballer, joined the club a few months later, scoring the only goal of the match against Dynamo Kyiv which brought Steaua an additional European Super Cup on 24 February 1987 in Monaco, just two months after having lost the Intercontinental Cup 1–0 to Argentinians River Plate in Tokyo. However, that match was marred with a questionable decision by referee José Martínez when he disallowed a clear goal scored by Miodrag Belodedici.

Surprisingly for those who thought of these performances as an isolated phenomenon, Steaua remained at the top of European football for the rest of the decade, managing one more European Cup semi-final against Benfica (1987–88) and one more European Cup final in 1989, which was lost 4–0 in front of Marco van Basten, Ruud Gullit and Frank Rijkaard's Milan. This happened next to their four additional national titles (1985–86, 1986–87, 1987–88, 1988–89) and four national cups (1984–85, 1986–87, 1987–88, 1988–89). In addition, from June 1986 to September 1989, Steaua ran a record 104-match undefeated streak in the championship, setting a world record for that time and a European one still standing.

During these last years of the Communist regime in Romania, dictator Nicolae Ceaușescu's son Valentin was involved in the life of the team. Valentin Ceaușescu admitted in a recent interview that he had done nothing else than to protect his favourite team from Dinamo's sphere of influence, ensured by the Ministry of Internal Affairs. Though contested by some, their five-year winning streak in the championship between 1984–85 and 1988-89 corroborates the notion that the team was really the best during this period.

Post-Revolution Era (1990–2002)

The Romanian Revolution led the country towards a free open market and, subsequently, several players of the great 1980s team left for other clubs in the West. Gheorghe Hagi left for Real Madrid for a record $4.3 million transfer fee which stands up to this day for the national championship, Marius Lăcătuș to Fiorentina, Dan Petrescu to Foggia, Silviu Lung to Logroñés, Ștefan Iovan to Brighton & Hove Albion, Tudorel Stoica to Lens, among other departures.

Therefore, three years followed in which the club won only a national cup in the 1991–92 season. However, a swift recovery followed and Steaua managed a six consecutive championship streak between 1992–93 and 1997–98 to equalize the 1920s performance of Chinezul Timișoara and also three more cups in 1995–96, 1996–97 and 1998–99. Other records highly regarded by the fans were the eight year and six month long undefeated streak in front of arch-rivals Dinamo București, which counted 19 matches in both the championship and the Romanian Cup, and the 17 year and 7 month long undefeated league run at Ghencea against the same Dinamo.

At international level, the club managed to reach the Cup Winners' Cup quarter-finals in 1993, when they lost on away goals to Royal Antwerp, and also to make it to the Champions League group stage three years in a row between 1994–95 and 1996–97.

In 1998, following lobbying from the football department president, Marcel Pușcaș, and new LPF regulations, the football club separated from CSA Steaua and changed their name for the last time to FC Steaua București (Fotbal Club Steaua București), being led by Romanian businessman Viorel Păunescu.

Gigi Becali takeover (2003–present)

Viorel Păunescu performed poorly as a president and soon the club was plunged into debt. Despite the title won in 2000–01, George "Gigi" Becali, another businessman, was offered the position of vice-president, in hope that he would invest money in the club. Becali eventually purchased 51% of the club's shares in February 2002 and turned the governing company into SA (Romanian equivalent for PLC) in January 2003. Later that year, he purchased another 14% of the shares and things moved in the same directions so that today he is the legal owner of the club, even though officially he transferred his shares to some of his nephews. Even though contested by many, including the majority of Steaua fans, because of his controversial character which saw him turn to politics further on, Becali has so far had inspired management plans for the club, also aided by former Chief Executive Mihai Stoica. Currently, George Becali retains no official link to the club, as he gradually renounced his shares. However, the fact the current shareholders are people loyal to him and that he is still in charge of Steaua are obvious.

In the summer of 2004, following a third consecutive year with no trophy won, former Italian glory Walter Zenga was appointed as head coach, becoming the first ever foreign Steaua manager. Following the appointment, results came immediately, as the team qualified for the UEFA Cup group stage and further on became the first Romanian team to make it to the European football spring since 1993 (also Steaua's performance), where they outpassed holders Valencia after a penalty shoot-out at Ghencea. Zenga was sacked with three matchdays to play in the Divizia A, but Steaua eventually won the title, performance repeated the following year, when, under coaches Oleh Protasov (August – December) and Cosmin Olăroiu (March 2006 – May 2007), they also managed to make it to the UEFA Cup semi-finals (knocked out dramatically by Middlesbrough's late goal in the 89th minute after having eliminated local rivals Rapid București in an all-Romanian quarter-final) and to win the Romanian Supercup (1–0 against the same Rapid București in July 2006), the latter being the club's 50th trophy in its 59-year history.

In the next season, after having successfully passed two qualifying rounds against Gorica and Standard Liège, Steaua reached the group stage of the 2006–07 UEFA Champions League, where they ended third in Group E, behind Lyon (0–3 home, 1–1 away) and Real Madrid (1–4 home, 0–1 away) and in front of Dynamo Kyiv (1–1 home, 4–1 away). However, their continuation in the UEFA Cup was short, having been outpassed by holders Sevilla in the round of 32.

Internally, even though ranked second during the winter break, they lost contact with leader Dinamo București, who built a massive point advance in front to win the title. Steaua still entered the second Champions League qualifying round as league runners-up. Steaua also qualified for the semi-finals of the Romanian Cup, a trophy not seen at Ghencea since 1999, where they were defeated by Politehnica Timișoara. In the Champions League, they passed Zagłębie Lubin (1–0 away and 2–1 home) and BATE Borisov (2–2 away and 2–0 home), and reached the group stage, where they played against Arsenal, Sevilla, and Sparta Prague. However, their performance was sub-par, finishing last with one point.

The 2008–09 Champions League season saw them advance to the group stage after defeating Galatasaray (2–2 away and 1–0 home), only to finish again last with one point, after Bayern Munich, Lyon and Fiorentina.

After the Ministry of National Defense sued Steaua București in 2011, claiming the Romanian Army were the rightful owners of the Steaua logo, colours, honours and name, the Executive Committee of the Romanian Football Federation approved an application to modify the name of the club from "SC Fotbal Club Steaua București SA" to "SC Fotbal Club FCSB SA" on 30 March 2017, following more judiciary sentences. CSA Steaua București had previously announced they would refound their football department in the summer of the same year. However, owner Becali announced that his team would retain the original honours and UEFA coefficient, and was also hopeful of recovering the name in the near future.

Between 2016 and 2019, FCSB finished each time as runner-ups in the league, thus becoming the first club in Romania to do so for four consecutive years. On 5 July 2019, yet another unfavorable ruling was handed out against the team—According to it, CSA Steaua would be the rightful entity to assert the honours up until 2003, however the decision is not definitive.

Shirt sponsors and manufacturers

1. On 2012–13 season Steaua makes a charity's to Mihai Neșu Foundation in order to display the logo on the club's kit against Ekranas, Ajax and Chelsea in Europa League.
2. From 17 March 2013 to July 2013.

Footnotes

References

Further reading 

FC Steaua București
History of association football clubs in Romania